Mater Dei Catholic College is a Roman Catholic co-educational secondary day school catering for students in Year 7 to Year 12, located in the Wagga Wagga suburb of , in New South Wales, Australia.

History 
Mater Dei Catholic College was established in 2003 by Wagga Wagga Diocesan Catholic Schools Office as part of the decision in 1999 to establish two Catholic co-educational colleges from Years 7 to 12. Prior to this, there was two 7-10 Catholic High schools, one for boys (Saint Michael's Regional High School, Wagga) and one for girls (Mount Erin High School, Wagga). Then, in years 11 and 12, both schools merged to Trinity Senior High School, located at the current site of Kildare Catholic College, Wagga.

Overview 

The school is a Catholic secondary school in the Wagga Wagga Denerary and Diocese. It has five houses which are each named after significant people in the college's history. Kennedy (Blue), after Graham Kennedy, Rosarie (Red), after Sister Rosarie, Webber (Green), after Sister Webber, Caroll (Purple) House after Bishop Carroll and Sherrin (Gold) after Brother Carl Sherrin, principal of Trinity Senior High from 1988 to 1993.

Principals
The following individuals have served as College Principal:

Notable alumni
Harrison Himmelberg- AFL Footballer
Matthew Kennedy- AFL Footballer
Harry Cunningham (footballer)- AFL Footballer
Elliott Himmelberg- AFL Footballer

See also 

 List of Catholic schools in New South Wales
 List of schools in the Riverina
 Catholic education in Australia

References

Catholic secondary schools in New South Wales
Educational institutions established in 2003
2003 establishments in Australia
Education in Wagga Wagga
Roman Catholic Diocese of Wagga Wagga